Relativity: The Special and the General Theory began as a short paper and was eventually published as a book written by Albert Einstein with the aim of explaining the theory of relativity.

Contents

Publication history
It was first published in German in 1916 and later translated into English in 1920. It is divided into 3 parts, the first dealing with special relativity, the second dealing with general relativity and the third dealing with considerations on the universe as a whole. There have been many versions published since the original in 1916, the latest in December, 2011.

Reception
People such as Robert W. Lawson have called the work unique in that it gives readers an insight into the thought processes of one of the greatest minds of the 20th century.

Notes

External links 

 
 Albert Einstein, Relativity: The Special and General Theory (1920/2000)  at Bartleby.com
 

Works by Albert Einstein
1920 non-fiction books